Somatochlora ozarkensis, the Ozark emerald is a species of dragonfly in the family Corduliidae. It is endemic to the United States and has its natural habitat in rivers.

References

Insects of the United States
Corduliidae
Taxonomy articles created by Polbot
Insects described in 1933